HMS E41 was a British E class submarine built by Cammell Laird, Birkenhead. She was laid down on 26 July 1915 and was commissioned in February 1916.

Design
She was powered by two  Vickers eight-cylinder two-stroke diesel engines and two  electric motors.

E41 was armed with a 12-pounder  QF gun mounted forward of the conning tower. She had five 18 inch (450 mm) torpedo tubes, two in the bow, one either side amidships, and one in the stern; a total of 10 torpedoes were carried.

E-Class submarines had wireless systems with  power ratings; in some submarines, these were later upgraded to  systems by removing a midship torpedo tube. Their maximum design depth was  although in service some reached depths of below . Some submarines contained Fessenden oscillator systems.

Service history
Sixteen crewmembers were lost, but fifteen escaped including seven from the bottom. Six crewmembers trapped in the submarine as she sank were able to escape by waiting under the conning-tower until the air pressure building up as the submarine sank blew the hatch open and allowed them to float to the surface. Chief Petty Officer William Brown was left behind, but was eventually able to escape from the engine room after an hour and a half in the sunken submarine.

HMS E41 was raised in September 1917 and was recommissioned. She was sold in Newcastle on 6 September 1922.

References

External links
 'Submarine losses 1904 to present day' - Royal Navy Submarine Museum 

 

British E-class submarines of the Royal Navy
Ships built on the River Mersey
1915 ships
World War I submarines of the United Kingdom
Royal Navy ship names
Maritime incidents in 1916
Submarines sunk in collisions
World War I shipwrecks in the North Sea
British submarine accidents